The Transcarpathian dialect is a dialect of the Ukrainian language spoken in Zakarpattia Oblast. It belongs to the Southwestern group of Ukrainian dialects.

Borders 
It is widespread in the valley of South Carpathians and the right bank of the Tisza river. It is used in some villages of Slovakia and Romania. It is bordered by the Boyko dialect to the north, the Hutsul dialect to the east, and by the Polish, Slovak, Hungarian and Romanian languages to the west.

History 
The main features of the Transcarpathian dialect were formed by the late 16th and early 17th centuries. Written monuments, which reflected the features of the Transcarpathian dialect, were found from the beginning of the 15th century. The dialect was used by some writers, such as V. Dovhovych (1783-1849) and M. Nod (1819-1862). During the 19th century the usage of the dialect decreased because of neighboring languages more widely used. The dialect was studied by linguists I. Fogorashii, I. Verkhratskyi, Pavlo Chuchka and others.

Subdialects 
The Transcarpathian has 4 subdialects:

 Borzhava
 Uzhansky
 Maramorosky
 Verkyhovyna

Differences 
The table below list a small portion of the differences (since there are more than 6,000) between the Transcarpathian dialect and Standard Ukrainian. Some of the words were taken from Hungarian or Slovak. Examples of this are railway station, piece and thousand, which were taken from the Hungarian words állomás, darab and ezer.

References 

Ukrainian dialects